A Voice from the Deep is a 1912 American short comedy film featuring Roscoe Arbuckle and Mabel Normand.

Cast
 Mabel Normand
 Roscoe 'Fatty' Arbuckle as (as Roscoe Arbuckle)
 Edward Dillon as Percy
 Fred Mace as Harold
 Marguerite Marsh as The Girl (as Marguerite Loveridge)
 William J. Butler as A Fisherman
 Dell Henderson as On Roller Coaster
 Florence Barker
 Harry Hyde as On Roller Coaster / On Beach
 J. Jiquel Lanoe as On Beach
 Florence Lee as On Roller Coaster
 Mae Marsh as On Beach

See also
 Fatty Arbuckle filmography

References

External links

1912 films
1912 comedy films
1912 short films
Silent American comedy films
American silent short films
American black-and-white films
Films directed by Mack Sennett
American comedy short films
1910s American films